The Curtain Falls is a 1939 German crime film directed by Georg Jacoby and starring Anneliese Uhlig, Elfie Mayerhofer and Hilde Sessak. It was based on a play by Paul van der Hurck and was made by UFA at the company's Babelsberg Studios in Berlin. The film's sets were designed by the art director Erich Kettelhut.

Cast
Anneliese Uhlig as Alice Souchy
Elfie Mayerhofer as Inge Blohm
Hilde Sessak as Vera Findtejs
Gustav Knuth as Doctor Cornelsen
Rudolf Fernau as Rodegger
Rolf Möbius as Hans Günther
Carl Kuhlmann as Walldorf
Rudolf Platte as Buttje
Hans Brausewetter as Berg
Aribert Mog as Wilke
Eberhard Leithoff as Nierweg
Volker von Collande as Rapp
Eduard Wenck as Reinicke
Alexander Engel as Cadoni
Lina Carstens as Frau Florian
Traute Rose as Singer

References

Bibliography 
 Klaus, Ulrich J. Deutsche Tonfilme: Jahrgang 1939. Klaus-Archiv, 1988.
 Rentschler, Eric. The Ministry of Illusion: Nazi Cinema and Its Afterlife. Harvard University Press, 1996.

External links

Films of Nazi Germany
1939 crime films
Films directed by Georg Jacoby
UFA GmbH films
German black-and-white films
German crime films
1930s German films
1930s German-language films
Films shot at Babelsberg Studios